Viktor Antonovich Sadovnichiy  (born  3 April 1939) is a Russian mathematician, winner of the 1989 USSR State Prize, and since 1992 the rector of Moscow State University. One of the main opinion leaders in Russia, Sadovnichiy has significant political and social influence.

Biography 
Sadovnichiy was born in the village Krasnopavlovka in Kharkiv Oblast, now in Ukraine. He graduated from the Department of Mechanics and Mathematics of Moscow State University and defended his doctoral thesis in 1974. In 1975 he became Professor, since 1982 until the present day he is the head of the Mathematical Analysis chair of the department. He held different offices in the administration of the University until he was elected the rector in 1992. In 1996, 2001 and 2005 Sadovnichiy was reelected without any other candidates.

On numerous occasions Viktor Sadovnichiy was accused of being one of the organizers of the infamous antisemitic admission policies of the Department of Mechanics and Mathematics during the 1970s and the 1980s.

Sadovnichiy has been a member of the Russian Academy of Sciences since 1994, Doctor Emeritus of  universities throughout the world, as well as the author of some 150 works. In 1989 he was awarded with the USSR State Prize. He is also a Vice-President of the Russian Academy of Sciences.

In 2022, he was the lead signature on the Address of the Russian Union of Rectors, which called to support Putin in his invasion of Ukraine.

World financial economic crisis
In their co-authored article “On the Possibilities to Forecast the Current Crisis and its Second Wave” (with Askar Akaev and Andrey Korotayev) in the Russian academic journal “Ekonomicheskaya politika” (December 2010. Issue 6. Pages 39–46 Клиодинамика - математические методы в истории) the three authors published «a forecast of the second wave of the crisis, which suggested that it may start in July — August, 2011».

Honours and awards

 Order of Merit for the Fatherland;
1st class (April 16, 2019)  for his outstanding contribution to the development of national education and many years of research and teaching activities
2nd class (25 January 2005)   for outstanding contribution to the development of education and many years of scientific and teaching activities
3rd class (2 April 1999)   for services to science, the talent and years of diligent work
4th class (31 March 2009)   for the great achievements in science, education and training of qualified specialists
 Order of the Red Banner of Labour, twice
 Medal "In Commemoration of the 850th Anniversary of Moscow"
 Medal "For Valiant Labour. To commemorate the 100th anniversary of VI Lenin"
 Order of Francisc Skorina (Belarus)
 Order "Dostyk" (Kazakhstan, 1998)
 Order of Merit (Ukraine);
1st class (26 March 2009)   for his outstanding personal contribution to strengthening Russian-Ukrainian cooperation in education and science, and many years of fruitful scientific and social activity
2nd class (6 December 2002)   for personal contribution into development of Ukrainian-Russian cooperation, active participation in providing for the Year of Ukraine in the Russian Federation
3rd class (30 March 1999)   a significant personal contribution to the development of economic and scientific-technical cooperation between Ukraine and the Russian Federation
 Commander of the Legion of Honour (France)
 Order of the Rising Sun, 2nd class (Japan, 2008) - for his contribution to scientific and technical cooperation and deepening understanding between the two countries
 Order of Holy Prince Daniel of Moscow, 2nd class (Russian Orthodox Church)
 USSR State Prize (1989)
 State Prize of the Russian Federation in the field of science and technology (2002)
 Honorary Member of Russian Academy of Arts

Controversies 
As Vice-Rector (1982-1984) and First Vice-Rector (1984-1992) of Moscow State University, he directed the Admission Committee of the Faculty of Mechanics and Mathematics and pursued a policy of preventing Jews from being admitted to the Mechanics and Mathematics Faculty. As a pro-rector he personally signed refusals in appeals. He has also been accused of discrimination against Jews while he served as a professor.

Public work 

In the october of 2014 the Moscow State University, the Russian Post
and "The teacher's newspaper" orginzed a contest essays among one
hundred thousand of Russian high schol student on the topic "The
person I trust". A few best essays, all of them written about the
Russian president Vladimir Putin, were personally presented by
Sadovnichiy to president Putin in October 2014

Political activity 
On April 3, 2022 Sadovnichiy initiated a letter of the rectors of Russian universities supporting the Russian invasion of Ukraine. The document, signed by Sadovnichy and co-signed by 304 other rectors of Russian universities, calls, among other things, for the "demilitarization and denazification of Ukraine", for "support [to be given to] the [Russian] army and the president".  The letter says that "supporting the patriotism is a duty of the [Russian] universities", and that the "[Russian] universities were always [among the] supporting piers of the [Russian] state".

References

Member info: Sadovnichy, Viktor Antonovich, Russian Academy of Sciences. Accessed January 23, 2010
Viktor Antonovich SADOVNICHY - Rector of Lomonosov Moscow State University. Moscow State University. Accessed January 23, 2010

External links

1939 births
Living people
Full Members of the Russian Academy of Sciences
Honorary Members of the Russian Academy of Education
Members of the Tajik Academy of Sciences
Moscow State University alumni
Academic staff of Moscow State University
Russian people of Ukrainian descent
People from Krasnopavlivka, Kharkiv Oblast
Russian mathematicians
Soviet mathematicians
Full Cavaliers of the Order "For Merit to the Fatherland"
Recipients of the Order of Francysk Skaryna
Recipients of the Order of Merit (Ukraine), 1st class
Commandeurs of the Légion d'honneur
Recipients of the Order of the Rising Sun, 2nd class
Recipients of the Order of Holy Prince Daniel of Moscow
Recipients of the USSR State Prize
State Prize of the Russian Federation laureates
Rectors of Moscow State University